Yonatan Uziel (born March 26, 1975) is an Israeli actor and model best known for appearing in  Prisoners of War and Hostages.

Early life and education
Uziel was born in Jerusalem and grew up in Tel Aviv. His mother is a former school principal and his father is an importer. He served as a youth counselor in the Education Corps and after completing his army service he began studying towards a BA in Economics and Education at the Hebrew University of Jerusalem. Then he turned to acting, taking classes at Nissan Nativ Acting Studio, which he completed in 2002. From 2003 to 2004, he studied at the Akt-Zent Studio in Moscow and Berlin performing in several plays.

In 2004–2008 he studied for a BA in philosophy and theater at Tel Aviv University and received a teaching certificate. Uziel began teaching acting classes during this period and in 2009 he founded the theater department at the Kfar HaYarok youth village and managed it until 2016.

Career
In 2003 he made his debut film appearance in Omri Levi's Miss Entebbe alongside Yael Abecassis. Two years later he had a minor role in Steven Spielberg's Mossad thriller, Munich. In 2006 he appeared in the drama, O Jerusalem.

In 2007 he began appearing in the Israeli romance drama, Until the Wedding. His role as Eyal, a macho-type character catapulted him to "sex symbol" status in Israel. The American Broadcasting Company is currently developing an American remake of the series.

He also appeared in the series Srugim in 2008. In 2010 he appeared in the American thriller, The Debt. In 2012 he was cast as a series regular playing Yinon 'Noni' Meiri in Gideon Raff's critically acclaimed series, Prisoners of War.

In 2014 he was cast as a series regular in the medical drama series, Temporarily Dead playing Dr. Alon Karmi alongside Fauda actors Tzachi Halevy and Yuval Segal. In 2016 he had a regular role as Boaz in the second season of Hostages alongside Jonah Lotan.

Personal life
Uziel lives in Tel Aviv and is married to Mikaela Burstow-Uziel, an Australian photographer.

Filmography

References

External links 
 

Israeli male film actors
Israeli male television actors
Israeli male models
Israeli Jews
Living people
1975 births
Tel Aviv University alumni
Hebrew University of Jerusalem Faculty of Social Sciences alumni
People from Jerusalem
21st-century Israeli male actors
School of Education at the Hebrew University of Jerusalem alumni